Albert Walter Bally (April 21, 1925 – July 30, 2019) was an American geologist, previously the Harry Carothers Wiess Professor of Emeritus at Rice University. He died in July 2019.

Career
Bally started his career at Shell Oil Company, retiring as Chief Geologist after 27 years in 1981. After retirement, he joined Rice University as chair of the Department of Geology and Geophysics. He remained active in the department until his death in 2019.

In 1988, Bally was elected President of the Geological Society of America. He died on July 30, 2019.

Awards

 William Smith Medal of the Geological Society of London, 1982
 Gustav Steinmann Medal of the Deutsche Geologische Gesellschaft, 1987
 Special Commendation Award of the Society of Exploration Geophysicists, 1995
 Sidney Powers Memorial Award of the American Association of Petroleum Geologists, 1998
 GeoLegends of the American Association of Petroleum Geologists, 2017

References

Rice University faculty
20th-century American geologists
20th-century Dutch geologists
University of Zurich alumni
Scientists from The Hague
1925 births
2019 deaths
Presidents of the Geological Society of America